The Florida–Florida State baseball rivalry, occasionally called the Sunshine Showdown, is an American college baseball rivalry between the teams of the two oldest public universities of the U.S. state of Florida: the University of Florida Gators and Florida State University Seminoles. Both universities participate in a range of intercollegiate sports, and for the last several years, the Florida Department of Agriculture and Consumer Services has sponsored a "Sunshine Showdown" promotion that tallies the total number of wins for each school in head to head sports competition.

The Florida and Florida State baseball series began in 1956, and the game has usually been played at least two times during the regular season. Since the 2007 season, the two teams have met in three-game midweek series played throughout the non-conference schedule, meeting first in Gainesville, then Jacksonville at 121 Financial Park, then Tallahassee. The 2020 series saw only the first game played, as the remainder of the season was canceled due to the COVID-19 pandemic. Current Gators head coach Kevin O'Sullivan has established a pattern of dominance in the series between the two collegiate baseball powers, holding a 29–17 against the Seminoles, including handing longtime Florida State head coach Mike Martin 11 consecutive losses to the Gators before his retirement after the 2019 season, making his all-time coaching record against the Gators 76–77.

The two programs have met in twelve different NCAA Baseball Tournaments, including four since O'Sullivan took over the Gators in 2008.

Game results

References 

College baseball rivalries in the United States
Florida Gators baseball
Florida State Seminoles baseball
Sports rivalries in Florida